Jorge Luis Gómez Carreño (born 1968-09-14) is a retired football (soccer) defender from Chile. He made his debut for the Chile national football team on 1997-06-11 in a Copa América match against Paraguay. He obtained a total number of eight caps during his professional career.

International career
Gómez made 7 appearances for Chile from 1997 to 1998. In addition, he played for Chile B against England B on February 10, 1998. Chile won by 2-1.

Personal life
He was born in San Vicente de Tagua Tagua and his nickname is Choche, an affectionate form of "Jorge".

References

External links

1968 births
Living people
People from Cachapoal Province
People from O'Higgins Region
Chilean footballers
Chile international footballers
Association football defenders
1997 Copa América players
O'Higgins F.C. footballers
C.D. Antofagasta footballers
Club Deportivo Universidad Católica footballers
Deportes Temuco footballers
Cobreloa footballers
Puerto Montt footballers
Unión San Felipe footballers
Chilean Primera División players
Primera B de Chile players